Emma Nadine Stevens (born 4 May 1986) is an English singer-songwriter and multi-instrumentalist, based in Guildford, Surrey, England. She achieved mainstream success with her single "Riptide" from her first album Enchanted, which was featured as iTunes Single of the Week in October 2013 and had over 150,000 downloads. She describes her music as "sparkly folk pop".

Early life and education
Born to parents Toby and Tina Stevens in Guildford in England, she has one younger sister, Ellen. Stevens grew up in Shalford just outside Guildford, where she lived until the age of 17. She attended Shalford First School, St Theresa's in Effingham and St Peter's in Merrow where she studied GCSE Music.

Stevens watched her mother play Spanish acoustic guitar at the age of two or three and made up "useless melodies". Spotting this early talent, her parents sent her to cello and piano lessons from the age of six. She later joined the
Surrey Youth Orchestra. From the age of about 10, Stevens had orchestra and piano lessons at Charterhouse, and attended stage school at the Yvonne Arnaud Theatre in 1999. Her songwriting began around age 12 or 13 when she took up the guitar properly: "I'd write a lot of melodies on the piano then too. I started writing poetry as well – I got a poem published in a national competition – and I started combining them with melodies".

Stevens's first appearance on stage was at the age of 13 at a local venue in Guildford. "I was terrified but I remember loving being on stage and singing my songs as I do now".

From 2006 to 2007, Stevens attended the Academy of Contemporary Music and graduated with a diploma in Guitar and Contemporary Performance. This is also where she met her guitarist Sam Whiting.

Early career
While still at ACM, Stevens and friend Charlotte "Charlie" Hewson formed Wildstar (described as "an acoustic/pop duo with a mix of harmony and mellow rock") with Hewson on lead vocals and Stevens on guitar and backing vocals. The duo played a combination of covers and original tracks including "Fine Day", "Looking For Love" and "Footprints". After graduating from ACM, Stevens worked as a session musician playing guitar and piano for groups such as Fin, H-Boogie and Ronit & The Aramingos. She met her first manager, Bob James, and started collaborating with writers across multiple genres. Her work included writing and performing on Britain's Got Talent finalist Andrew Muir's debut album (still unreleased); she co-wrote "Can't Say That It's Over", "Don't Let Me Go" and "You Don't Seem to Understand Me" for the album in 2009. Soon after, she wrote a song called "Wowowow" for Korean boy-band SHINee, which appeared on their second album Lucifer in 2010. The song sold 100,000 copies in its first week as a single.

Performing in the band Shooting Lead Rabbits (described as "a three-piece, retro, art house, alternative, folk rock band") led to a European tour in 2010 and a distribution deal with FNAC. The band's self-titled and only album release features Stevens on backing vocals on four of the tracks.

During songwriting sessions in Los Angeles with Charlie Midnight, with his encouragement, Stevens began to seriously consider a future solo career.

Other collaborations have included Sharon Vaughn, Eric Shermehorn, Andy Goldmark, Wayne Rodriguez, Mimoza Blinsson, Adam Kagan, Will Simms, Russ Ballard and John Beck.

In 2011, she toured with British rock band Fin, supporting Incubus, Mona, The Kooks and Feeder, regularly performing for crowds of 20,000.

Solo career

2012–2014: Enchanted 
In early 2012, Stevens' mother was diagnosed with cancer. Along with Charlie Midnight, her mother had been strongly encouraging her to embark on a solo career – "she was my biggest supporter and believer in me and would say, ‘You’ve got the potential to do it yourself.’ So I thought, ‘Yeah, I’m going to do it!’".

Two weeks before her mother died on 26 March 2012, they sat down together and decided that the first album would be released initially as a series of four EPs. Tina Stevens designed the cover artwork that would be used, in four sections, for each of the EPs. Placed together, the four pieces form the entire cover of the full album, Enchanted.

Earlier, in November 2011, Stevens had started collaborating with songwriter/producer Pete Woodroffe (best known for his work with Def Leppard) who would eventually co-write 14 of the tracks and produce all four EPs and the album. In an interview in December 2013, she declared Woodroffe as her "Ultimate Hero".

In August 2012, Stevens was picked up by the BBC Introducing series for new and unsigned artists. On 19 August 2012 she performed four songs live on air with band members Sam Whiting, Belinda Webb and Emma Hughes.

The first single, "A Place Called You", was released on 28 October 2012 and received its first national airplay on BBC Radio 2's Weekend Wogan show on 2 September 2012. The single is one of her most successful songs, with over 3 million streams on Spotify.

Stevens toured extensively during the remainder of 2012, promoting the Heart on Hand EP.

In January 2013, she collaborated with English folk-rock singer-songwriter Passenger, which resulted in the song "I'll Be Your Man".

In early 2013, Terry Wogan continued to champion the Heart on Hand EP, culminating in a live appearance on Weekend Wogan on 17 March 2013, where Stevens performed the next single to be released, "Once". Also appearing on this show was American singer-songwriter Jenn Bostic, with whom she performed a live cover of Ed Sheeran's "Give Me Love". Stevens and Bostic would become firm friends and would tour together twice during 2013.

Soon after this appearance, "Once" was playlisted by BBC Radio 2 on 27 March 2013.

Following the success of "Once", the original single "A Place Called You" was re-released and was subsequently playlisted by BBC Radio 2 on 27 July 2013.

Further support came from BBC Radio 2 Breakfast presenter Chris Evans, resulting in a live appearance on the show on 16 August 2013, where Stevens performed "A Place Called You". During the show, Evans invited her to play at his Carfest festival in aid of the BBC Children in Need charity on 24 August 2013.

Another live appearance on BBC Radio 2 soon followed on 18 August 2013 when she performed "Sunflower" on Good Morning Sunday. The following month, Stevens headlined the BBC Introducing stage at Festival in a Day in Hyde Park on 8 September 2013.

Recording work on the debut album was completed on 9 September 2013, and growing success led to the accelerated release of the final two EPs. Sunflower, the final EP, was released on 20 October 2013 and contained the third single "Riptide" as well as the title track "Sunflower", the second of two songs Stevens wrote about coping with the loss of her mother. "When I wrote 'Sunflower' I came up with the title because my Mum used to grow Sunflowers at the bottom of the garden when I was a little girl, and I really felt the urge to use that and turn it into a lyric. It's one of the saddest songs I have written, but I just desperately needed to – it helped me in the grieving process after losing my Mum and it helps me every day when I sing it on stage".

"Riptide" and "Sunflower" were each written in less than a day. BBC Radio 2 again playlisted the new single on 28 September 2013, and further support followed from iTunes when the track became their Single of the Week in the UK, Ireland, Russia and India on 22 October 2013.

After the album was completed, rather than sign to a major label, Stevens decided to self-release Enchanted, and signed a deal with label services company Absolute Marketing and Distribution Ltd.

In January 2014, Stevens' manager announced that "Riptide" would be released via Go Entertainment in Benelux and Universal in Ireland. In the following month, the single was playlisted by Radio 2 and radiomol in Belgium and Radio 2 in the Netherlands.

2014–2017: Waves and To My Roots 
During 2014, Stevens again collaborated with co-writer and producer Pete Woodroffe on her second album, Waves. The first single from the new album, "Make My Day", was released in August 2014 and was, once again, playlisted by BBC Radio 2. Stevens performed the song live on Weekend Wogan on 7 September 2014.

Recording the album was completed on 15 August 2014 and Waves was subsequently released on 10 November 2014.

In August 2015, an expanded deluxe edition of Waves was released with new artwork and eight additional tracks (ten additional tracks were included on the limited edition CD digipack version). One of the new tracks, "Never Gonna Change", was released as a single in June 2015.

During the summer of 2015, Stevens spent a month in Nashville collaborating with musicians and songwriters as she prepared for her third studio album, To My Roots. This was to be her first self-produced album, and included songs co-written with Charlie Midnight, Pete Woodroffe and Buck Johnson. Musicians appearing on the album included Michael Spriggs, Bruce Bouton, Jonathan Yudkin and Miles Bould. A radio edit of "Sing Out (Hey La Hey Lo)", remixed by Ash Howes, was released as the first single from the album in June 2017 with a short headline tour to promote the album. To My Roots was released on 21 July 2017, followed by the second single, the title track from the album and another remix by Ash Howes, "To My Roots" in August 2017.

In April 2017, Stevens was invited to be a member of the UK national jury for the Eurovision Song Contest.

2017–present: Christmas, Atoms and Light Year 
In November 2017, Christmas, a collection of four festive songs, was released digitally and as a limited edition CD EP. It included covers of "Stay Another Day", "Somewhere Only We Know" and the traditional carol "Silent Night", a collaboration with Nashville's Michael Spriggs.

Stevens' track "A Place Called You" became a streaming hit in China after being featured on Where Are We Going Dad? a Chinese reality TV show broadcast on Hunan Television attracting 75 million viewers. A new track, "The Cappuccino Song", was recorded in early 2019 and released (in China only) during April 2019 to coincide with Stevens' seven city tour of the country. The track was also included on the album A Place Called You, effectively a Greatest Hits compilation, released only in China.

During 2018, Stevens had collaborated with writers Charlie Midnight, Jessica Sharman and Kevin Jeremiah (from the band The Feeling) resulting in a five track EP entitled Atoms released 10 May 2019. The lead single, "Because It's You" is a duet with Kevin Jeremiah and also includes contributions from other The Feeling band members Ciaran Jeremiah (guitar) and Paul Stewart (drums). The title track from the EP, "Atoms", was subsequently remixed by Pete Woodroffe and released as the second single on 22 November 2019.

Stevens' fourth studio album, titled Light Year, was released on 30 April 2021. Its lead single, "Jump In", was released on 4 September 2020, and five additional singles were released before the album; "Forever", "The Rain Fell on Haikou", "Keep Dreaming", "On a Day Like Today" and "The Grass Is Always Greener".

Two further singles have been released, "The Longing" was released on 29 October 2021 and "Love Revolution" was released on 3 June 2022. Both tracks mark a change to a heavier, more rock-orientated sound for the forthcoming fifth album.

Personal life
Stevens still lives in the Guildford area.

Other than her music, her greatest passions are surfing and the sea. Stevens married her long-term boyfriend Sam Rommer at Croyde Bay in July 2022.

Discography

EPs
Heart on Hand (2012)
Dreaming Trees (2013)
Underwater (2013)
Sunflower (2013)
Christmas (2017)
Atoms (2019)

Albums
Enchanted (2013)
Waves (2014)
Waves (Deluxe Edition) (2015)
To My Roots (2017)
Light Year (2021)

Singles
"A Place Called You" (October 2012)
"Once" (March 2013)
"Riptide" (October 2013)
"Make My Day" (August 2014)
"Gold Rush" (November 2014)
"Never Gonna Change" (June 2015)
"Sing Out (Hey La Hey Lo)" (June 2017)
"To My Roots" (August 2017)
"Because It's You" (May 2019)
"Atoms" (November 2019)
"Jump In" (September 2020)
"Forever" (October 2020)
"The Rain Fell on Haikou" (November 2020)
"Keep Dreaming" (December 2020)
"On a Day Like Today" (January 2021)
"The Grass Is Always Greener" (February 2021)
"The Longing" (October 2021)
"Love Revolution" (June 2022)

Notable television and radio live performances

BBC Introducing Session (BBC Radio Surrey, 19 August 2012)
The Late Show (BBC London, 30 September 2012)
Weekend Wogan (BBC Radio 2, 17 March 2013)
Danny Pike Show (BBC Sussex, 15 June 2013)
Breakfast with Spencer Howson (ABC Radio Brisbane, 15 August 2013)
Chris Evans Breakfast Show (BBC Radio 2, 16 August 2013)
Good Morning Sunday (BBC Radio 2, 18 August 2013)
Festival in a Day (BBC TV, 8 September 2013)
Spencer Howson Christmas Show (ABC Radio Brisbane, 13 December 2013)
The Janice Long Review Show (Vintage TV, 26 January 2014)
The Janice Forsyth Show (BBC Radio Scotland, 7 April 2014)
The Late Late Show (RTÉ, 16 May 2014)

Langs de Lijn En Omstreken (NPO Radio 1, 17 May 2014)
Muziekcafé (Radio 2 (Netherlands), 17 May 2014)
Weekend Wogan (BBC Radio 2, 7 September 2014)
GI:EL (NPO 3FM, 19 September 2014)
Sound for Sight (BBC Radio 2, 8 October 2014)
BBC South Today Children in Need (BBC South Today, 14 November 2014)
The Janice Forsyth Show (BBC Radio Scotland, 23 April 2015)
Chris Evans Breakfast Show (BBC Radio 2, 30 July 2015)
BBC South Today Children in Need (BBC South Today, 6 November 2015)
Brooklands Country with Alex Nairn (Brooklands Radio, 23 May 2016)
Chongqing Music Interview and Sessions (Chongqing Music Radio, 22 April 2019)
BBC South Today Evening News (BBC South Today, 1 May 2019)

Solo tours
Stevens embarked on the Heart on Hand Tour following the release of her first EP.

During February 2013, Stevens supported Jenn Bostic on her first UK tour.

The Dreaming Trees Tour promoted EP number two, the first to be released in 2013.

During September and October 2013, Stevens supported British singer-songwriter Sam Gray on his UK tour.

During November and December 2013, Stevens once again joined Jenn Bostic on her second UK tour.

In March 2014, Stevens embarked on the Enchanted Tour, a national headline tour accompanied by her full band.

Beginning in April 2015, Stevens embarked on the Waves Tour, a national tour co-headlining with Blair Dunlop.

In June 2017, Stevens embarked on the to My Roots Tour, a full band national tour to promote her third studio album, with musicians Stu Wilkinson (Mandolin), Sam Rommer (Bass), Sam Whiting (Guitar) and Tom O. Mitchell (Drums & Percussion).

In May and June 2018, Stevens embarked on the to My Roots Spring Tour, this time as a trio along with Stu Wilkinson (Mandolin) & Sam Rommer (Bass).

In April 2019, Stevens embarked on her first tour of mainland China.

In May 2019, Stevens embarked on the Atoms Tour promoting her Atoms EP.

References

External links
, official website

1986 births
Living people
English country singers
English pop singers
English women singer-songwriters
British indie pop musicians
21st-century British  women singers